This is a list of films which placed number-one at the weekend box office in Brazil during 2019.

Highest-grossing films

References 

2019 in Brazil
2019
Brazil